Skepperia is a genus of fungi in the family Thelephoraceae. The genus was described by mycologist Miles Joseph Berkeley in 1857 to contain the type species Skepperia convoluta. The genus was circumscribed by Berkeley in Trans. Linn. Soc. London vol.22 on page 130 in 1857.

The genus name of Skepperia is in honour of Edmund Skepper (1825–1867), who was a British botanist and chemist.

Distribution
It is only recorded as being found in a few places worldwide, America and New Zealand.

Species
As accepted by Species Fungorum;
 Skepperia andina 
 Skepperia convoluta 
 Skepperia platensis 
 Skepperia zeylanica 

Former species;
 S. carpatica  = Cotylidia carpatica, Rickenellaceae family
 S. spathularia  = Skepperiella spathularia Agaricales order

References

External links

Thelephorales
Thelephorales genera